Val Sullivan (born 17 August 1963) is a former American rugby union player. She was a member of the  squad that won the inaugural 1991 Women's Rugby World Cup in Wales.

Sullivan attended Slippery Rock University of Pennsylvania where she played collegiate rugby before moving to Florida State to study for a master’s degree in exercise physiology. She was inducted into the United States Rugby Hall of Fame along with the 1991 World Cup team in 2017.

References 

Living people
1963 births
Female rugby union players
American female rugby union players
United States women's international rugby union players